Ganga Ram Koli (born 5 January 1937) is an Indian politician and a leader of Bharatiya Janata Party. He was born in 1937 in Bayana in Bharatpur district. He was elected to the 10th Lok Sabha from Bayana constituency in Rajasthan in 1991. He was re-elected to Lok Sabha in 1996 and 1998 from the same constituency. In 1998 he defeated Jagannath Pahadia, the former Chief Minister of Rajasthan.

Koli was married on March 4, 1952 to Smt. Malati Devi. Together they have four sons and three daughters.

References

External links
 Biographical Sketch in Parliament of India website

Rajasthani politicians
1937 births
Living people
People from Bharatpur, Rajasthan
Lok Sabha members from Rajasthan
Bharatiya Janata Party politicians from Rajasthan
India MPs 1991–1996
India MPs 1996–1997
India MPs 1998–1999
India MPs 1999–2004